This article is a list of King's and Queen's commissioners of the province of Drenthe, Netherlands.

List of King's and Queen's commissioners of Drenthe since 1945

References

Drenthe